Gioachino Rossini (1792–1868) was an Italian composer.

Rossini may also refer to:

 Rossini (cocktail), cocktail
 Rossini (film), a 1942 Italian musical drama film 
 Rossini (surname), Italian surname

See also 

 Rossi (disambiguation)
 Rossino (disambiguation)